The Copa Argentina (English: Argentine Cup), officially known as the "Copa Argentina AXION energy" due to sponsorship reasons, is an official football cup competition organized by the Argentine Football Association (AFA), with the aim of qualifying one club to the Copa Libertadores.

The first editions of the championship were contested by teams playing in Primera División that did not earn eligibility to participate in the Copa Libertadores of the following year, and the best placed clubs playing in regional leagues.

The tournament was re-launched in 2011, with teams of all divisions that form the Argentine football league system taking part of the championship. The winner of Copa Argentina qualifies for the Supercopa Argentina against the reigning champions of Primera División.

Boca Juniors is the most successful team with four titles won, the latest in 2019–20.

History

Background 
The "Campeonato de la República" (or Copa General Pedro Ramírez)) had been the first Argentine cup contested by clubs playing not only in Primera División but in regional leagues as well, with a total of 35 teams in the first edition. The cup was held from 1943 to 1945.

A new international competition, "Copa Ganadores de Copa (also known as "Recopa Sudamericana"), organised by CONMEBOL in 1970 as a South American counterpart of UEFA Cup Winners' Cup, served as inspiration to the Argentine Association to create a new competition, with the winner team being eligible to play the 1970 edition of Copa Ganadores de Copa.

First edition: 1969

The competition was contested by 32 teams using a two-legged elimination format. Two points were awarded for winning a leg, one for a draw and null for a loss. The teams having more points would qualify to the next round. If both teams had same number of points, it would be determined by the total number of goals, total number of goals conceded, and penalty shootout accordingly.

All teams in the Primera División Argentina participated the competition with some top teams from the regional leagues, except teams that had already qualified to the Copa Libertadores, namely, Vélez Sársfield and River Plate, the winners and runners-up of 1968 Nacional respectively, and Estudiantes (LP), the champions of 1968 Copa Libertadores.

Boca Juniors and Atlanta entered the final. Boca won the tournament by defeating Atlanta 3–2 on aggregate after two matches were played.

However, as Boca later won the 1969 Nacional and qualified to the 1970 Copa Libertadores, Atlanta qualified to the 1970 "Copa Ganadores de Copa" as the runner-up.

Second edition: 1970

Apart from teams that had got the Copa Libertadores eligibility, namely Boca Juniors and River Plate, the champions and runners-up of Nacional 1969, and Estudiantes (LP), who won the Copa Libertadores 1969, all clubs in the Primera División Argentina participated this competition. The champions of Primera B, Ferro, also took part in the tournament, along with 13 top clubs from regional leagues.

Copa Argentina 1970 never finished. 32 teams played the competition and San Lorenzo and Vélez Sársfield entered the final. The tournament had been lasting for a long period in that year. Starting in March 1970, the first leg of the final was played in March 1971. At that time, the Copa Ganadores de Copa, which the winner of Copa Argentina would be qualifying for, had already started. Moreover, as Huracán Buceo and Deportes Concepción, the two other team in the same group with the Argentine representative in the Copa Ganadores de Copa, had not confirmed their participation, so the organizer announced the Copa Ganadores de Copa would become a friendly tournament. Therefore, after the first leg of the Copa Argentina final was held, which the teams drew 2-2, the second leg was never played. No Argentine teams participated in the Copa Ganadores de Copa 1971.

Relaunch

The reschedule of the Copa Argentina –officialized in 2011– included 186 teams of 7 divisions of the Argentine football league system in a knock-out system competition. All the matches were disputed in neutral locations. The teams of the first division were included in rounds of 32. The champion of the tournament qualified for the next edition of Copa Sudamericana.

For the relaunching of the tournament, a new trophy was designed. The cup, made of aluminium, was manufactured at the Norberto Ambrosetti factory of Lobos, Buenos Aires.

The 2012 final between Boca and Racing was scheduled many times due to fixture congestion. The match was finally played on August 8, 2012, at the Estadio del Bicentenario in San Juan. Boca Juniors won its second trophy after defeating Racing Club by 2-1.

The 2012–13 Copa Argentina was scheduled to begin October 23, 2012 in a new two-phase knock-out competition. Arsenal defeated San Lorenzo and won its first trophy of this competition.

Champions
The following is the list of Copa Argentina winners with the finals played:

Notes:

Titles by club

Topscorers 
Source:

See also
 Argentine Primera División
 Supercopa Argentina
 List of Argentine football national cups

References

External links
 

 
Football competitions in Argentina
Recurring sporting events established in 1969
Argentina